Battlefield 1942 is a 2002 first-person shooter video game developed by DICE and published by Electronic Arts for Microsoft Windows and Mac OS X. The game can be played in single-player mode against the video game AI or in multiplayer mode against players on the Internet or in a local area network. It is a popular platform for mod developers, with many released modifications that alter the gameplay and theme.

In-game, players assume the role of one of five classes of infantry: Scout, Assault, Anti-Tank, Medic, and Engineer. Players also have the ability to fly various World War II fighter aircraft and bombers, navigate capital ships, submarines, and aircraft carriers, man coastal artillery defenses, drive tanks, APCs and jeeps, and take control of anti-aircraft guns and mounted machine guns.

Each battle takes place on one of several maps located in a variety of places and famous battlefields in all of the major theaters of World War II: the Pacific, European, North African, Eastern, and Italian Fronts. Combat is between the Axis Powers and the Allies. The location determines which nation-specific armies are used (for example, on the Wake Island map, it is Japan versus the United States, while on the El Alamein map, it is Germany versus the United Kingdom). The maps in Battlefield 1942 are based on real battles and are somewhat realistically portrayed.

Upon release, Battlefield 1942 received generally favorable reviews, with particular praise directed towards the innovative gameplay, multiplayer, and World War II theme. The game went on to perform well commercially, with over 3 million copies sold by 2004. Since its release, the game has spawned numerous sequels and spin-offs, which became part of what ultimately would become the Battlefield game series.

Gameplay 

The gameplay of Battlefield 1942 generally has a more co-operative focus than previous games of this nature, as it is not only important to kill the opposition but to also hold certain "control points" around the map. Capturing control points allows the team to reinforce itself by enabling players and vehicles to spawn in a given area. Additionally, capturing and controlling control points also reduces enemy reinforcements. Battlefield 1942 was one of the first mainstream games to represent a dramatic shift in FPS gameplay mentality not only favoring individualism but simultaneously encouraging teamwork and coordination.

The default gameplay mode, Conquest, centers on the capture and control of control points; once a team captures a control point, its members can respawn from it. When a team loses control of all their control points, they cannot respawn. And if no one is alive, the team with no "spawn" points or the popular term "tickets" loses.

Games are composed of rounds. A team wins the round when the other team runs out of tickets. A team loses tickets when its members are killed, but also when the other team holds a majority of the capture points on the map (typically when one team holds more capture points than the other). Therefore, sometimes the winning team must hunt down straggling or hiding enemy forces at the end of a round.

Spawn tickets also play a vital role in the success of both teams. Every time a player on a team dies and respawns, their team loses one ticket. Every team starts each round with between 150 and 300 tickets, depending on the team's role (e.g., defense). Teams also gradually lose tickets depending on how many spawn points they control. As a general rule, the fewer spawn points controlled by a team, the more tickets they lose, and as they hold on these spawn points reduces, the tickets start dropping at a much quicker pace. For a team of 32 on a 64 player map, with 150 tickets, this means a little less than 5 respawns or deaths on average for every player if they hold their starting spawn points.

Roles 
The player can choose to play as either the Allied team or the Axis team. The Allies consist of the United States, the United Kingdom, Canada and the Soviet Union, while the Axis consists of Nazi Germany and Imperial Japan. Regardless of which nation is chosen by the player, there are five different roles of infantry that the player can assume the role: Scout, Assault, Medic, Anti-tank, and Engineer.

Each role has its own strength and weakness. For example, the scout role has long-range surveillance, high stopping power and the ability to provide spotting for artillery shelling against an enemy position (unlike other games with a similar feature, other player characters must also supply the artillery fire); however, the sniper rifle is not designed to be used in close-quarter combat and players frequently treat this role as just a plain sniper role by not providing spotting for artillery. Assault is the standard role and provides very aggressive firepower. The Anti-tank role specializes against vehicles and tanks, but their main weapon is inaccurate against moving enemy infantry. The Medic role has the ability to heal (himself and other players), but his sub-machine gun has less stopping power than the Assault's weapons. The Engineer has the ability to repair damaged vehicles and stationary weapons, and they also have the ability to deploy explosives, which are highly effective against both enemy infantry and vehicles, and lastly, land mines, which destroy enemy vehicles on contact.

Development 
In 2000, DICE acquired Refraction Games (developers of Codename Eagle) and inherited the in-development Battlefield 1942. The game was originally proposed by DICE as a GameCube exclusive. Though satisfied with the proposal, negotiations never made it further because Nintendo had no online strategy. The game was developed by a team of 14 people at Digital Illusions. Battlefield 1942 was built on the formula of the less well-known and successful Codename Eagle video game, set in an alternate history World War I. It featured single and multiplayer modes. The earlier Refractor 1 engine had more arcade-style physics and a less realistic focus than its successor, Refractor 2, which was used in Battlefield 2. A Macintosh-compatible version of Battlefield 1942 was made and released by Aspyr Media in mid-2004. An Xbox version of the game was also announced in early 2001 but was cancelled almost two years later so Electronic Arts could more closely work on an expansion pack for the PC.

Expansions 
Two expansion packs would be released for Battlefield 1942, Battlefield 1942: The Road to Rome (adding the Italian Front) and Battlefield 1942: Secret Weapons of WWII, both adding various new gameplay modes, maps, and game concepts. The Road to Rome focuses on the Italian battles, allowing players to play as the Free French forces or as the Royal Italian Army. Secret Weapons of WWII focuses on prototypical, experimental, and rarely used weapons and vehicles (such as jet packs), and added subfactions to the German and British Armies, the German Elite Troops and British Commandos. Accompany each were patches to the base game that fixed bugs, and added extra content (such as the Battle of Britain map) to the base game. Battlefield 1942 Deluxe Edition includes the original game and Battlefield 1942: The Road To Rome, and the Battlefield 1942: World War II Anthology added Battlefield 1942: Secret Weapons of WWII expansion pack. Battlefield 1942: The Complete Collection later added Battlefield Vietnam and Battlefield Vietnam WWII Mod.

Reception 

In the United States, Battlefield 1942 sold 680,000 copies and earned $27.1 million by August 2006. At the time, this led Edge to rank it as the country's 18th best-selling computer game released since January 2000. Combined sales of all Battlefield computer games, including Battlefield 1942, had reached 2.7 million units in the United States by August 2006. In December 2002, the game received a "Gold" sales award from the Verband der Unterhaltungssoftware Deutschland (VUD), indicating sales of at least 100,000 units across Germany, Austria and Switzerland. The game sold more than 3 million copies by July 2004.

The game received "generally favorable reviews", just one point shy of "universal acclaim", according to the review aggregation website Metacritic. At 6th annual Interactive Achievement Awards, Battlefield 1942 received awards for Online Gameplay, Innovation in PC Gaming, PC Game of the Year, and Game of the Year. In March 2010 Battlefield 1942 was awarded with "Swedish game of the decade" award at the computer game gala hosted by Swedish Games Industry.

Scott Osborne of GameSpot called it a "comic book version of WWII." The publication later named it the best computer game of September 2002. Steve Butts of IGN praised the multiplayer, but said that "the single-player game leaves much to be desired."

PC Gamer US and Computer Games Magazine named Battlefield 1942 the best multiplayer computer game and best overall computer game of 2002; it tied with No One Lives Forever 2 for the latter award in Computer Games Magazine. It also won GameSpots annual "Best Multiplayer Action Game on PC" and "Biggest Surprise on PC" awards, and was nominated in the publication's "Best Graphics (Technical) on PC" and "Game of the Year on PC" categories. PC Gamer USs editors hailed it as "the realization of our 'dream PC game' — multiplayer battles in which every interesting element of combat is playable by human teammates and opponents."

The Academy of Interactive Arts & Sciences awarded Battlefield 1942 with four honors at the 6th Annual Interactive Achievement Awards (now known as the D.I.C.E. Awards): "Game of the Year", "Computer Game of the Year", "Innovation in Computer Gaming" and "Outstanding Achievement in Online Gameplay"; it was also nominated for "Outstanding Achievement in Game Design".

Franchise 

Battlefield 1942 was the first in the Battlefield series and would go on to spawn many sequels and spin-offs set in different eras of war. Releases included Battlefield Vietnam in 2004, Battlefield 2 in 2005, Battlefield 2142 in 2006, Battlefield 1943 in 2009, Battlefield: Bad Company in 2008 and the 2010 sequel, Battlefield 3 in 2011, Battlefield 4 in 2013, Battlefield Hardline, a cops-and-robbers spinoff, in 2015, Battlefield 1, a World War I based title, in 2016, Battlefield V, the first time since Battlefield 1943 that the series saw a return to a World War II theater of operations, and the first since Battlefield 1942 set outside the Pacific Ocean theater of World War II in 2018, and Battlefield 2042 in 2021. All of these releases have been overseen by DICE, with Hardline being developed by Visceral Games, with additional developers like Criterion Games, EA Gothenburg and Ripple Effect Studios providing additional development.

Mods 
An October 2004 public release from EA noted the game's modding community.

Like Half-Life and some other popular FPS games, Battlefield 1942 spawned a number of mods.  Most did not progress very far and were abandoned without ever producing a public release.  Some are very limited and just include some gameplay changes or even a different loading screen while others are total conversions that modify content and gameplay extensively. A few mods have become popular and are nearly games in their own right.  Early modifications of Battlefield 1942 were produced without a software development kit.  Later a "Mod Development Kit", Battlefield Mod Development Toolkit, was produced by EA to help the development of mods. With the release of the Battlefield 1942 sequel Battlefield Vietnam and Battlefield 2, some mods have released a new version or have continued development with that game.  Battlefield Vietnam uses an updated version of the Refractor 2 game engine. Some mods have switched to the computer games Söldner: Secret Wars, Half-Life 2 while others were releasing a standalone game after completed mod development for Battlefield 1942 (Eve of Destruction - REDUX and FinnWars).

Battlefield 1918, A mod set during World War I which was first released in 2004 and as of December 2022 is still in active development.  Battlefield 1918 was mentioned as an inspiration for Battlefield 1 by key DICE employee Lars Gustavsson in a 2016 interview.
 Battlefield Interstate 1982, mentioned in 1UP "Free PC Games" December 2003 article. (Free PC Games "1UP.ORG" December 2003.)
 Battle G.I. Joe was reviewed on About.com, by Michael Klappenbach. The mod was also contacted by Hasbro for IP issues, as noted in Am I Mod or Not? (Nieborg, 2005)
 Desert Combat, produced by Trauma Studios, was winner of FilePlanet's Best Mod of 2003 Award and many other reviews and awards, such as the March 2003 PC Magazine. PC Gamer described it as "Desert Combat is set in the white-hot conflict zone of the Middle East and pits the United States against Iraq."  Articles noted it was helped by the Iraq War, which increased the number of page views to approximately 15,000 per day, or even between 20,000 and 70,000. Desert Combat was pointed out as having two mods of its own, DC Extended and Desert Combat Realism in Am I Mod or Not? (Nieborg, 2005)
 Eve Of Destruction was the winner of PC Gamer 2003 Mod of the Year. Dan Morris of PC Gamer noted in the March 2004 issue of PC Gamer, "While Battlefield Vietnam was still a twinkle in its developers' eyes, this standout mod debuted to a rapturous reception from the Battlefield 1942 faithful."
 Experience WWII was described in PC Gamer as having substantial changes to be historically accurate that directly impacts gameplay.
 FinnWars was featured in Pelit magazine in issue 9/2005, and PC Pelaaja in 2007. FinnWars is based in Winter and Continuation Wars between Finland and the Soviet Union, as well as Lapland War between Finland and Nazi Germany.
 Forgotten Hope, a 2003 mod that aimed at a high degree of historical accuracy, was noted for including over 250 new pieces of authentic equipment (at the time more than any other World War II-themed FPS). It was awarded the Macologist Mod of the Year Award by Inside Mac Games in 2006 after the mod was ported to the Mac. It was followed by its 2006 Battlefield 2 sequel, Forgotten Hope 2.
 Galactic Conquest was noted for its permission to blatantly use Lucasarts Star Wars universe material in Am I Mod or Not? (Nieborg, 2005).  It was mentioned in Edge in April 2004. Galactic Conquest was reviewed on TechTV's X-Play show in 2004.
 HydroRacers was reviewed in PC Zone in 2004 by Tony Lamb, and also the Madison Courier in June 2004.
 Siege was pointed out in a study by Utrecht University, both for its original concept, and its medieval warfare theme. Am I Mod or Not? (Nieborg, 2005)
 SilentHeroes won the PC ACTION-Super Mod Award in edition 07/2006 of the German gaming-magazine PC ACTION. Also, it was featured on many Norwegian and Swedish media websites, including VG, Aftonbladet and IDG.
 Who Dares Wins was reviewed in August 2005 UK edition of PC Gamer magazine and a copy of version 0.2 was distributed with the magazine on DVD-ROM to its readers.

References

External links 
 
 
 
 

2002 video games
Aspyr games
AIAS Game of the Year winners
 01
British Academy Games Award for Multiplayer winners
Cancelled Xbox games
Electronic Arts games
Fiction set in 1942
Golden Joystick Award winners
Inactive online games
Interactive Achievement Award winners
Multiplayer and single-player video games
Multiplayer online games
MacOS games
Pacific War video games
Video games about the United States Marine Corps
Video games developed in Sweden
Video games set in Belgium
Video games set in England
Video games set in Egypt
Video games set in France
Video games set in Germany
Video games set in Berlin
Video games set in the Netherlands
Video games set in Japan
Video games set in Libya
Video games set in Oceania
Video games set in the Philippines
Video games set in the Solomon Islands
Video games set in the Soviet Union
Video games set in the United States
Video games set in Russia
Video games set in Ukraine
Video games with expansion packs
War video games set in the United States
Windows games
World War II first-person shooters
D.I.C.E. Award for Online Game of the Year winners